Ian Isles  (24 August 191724 March 2015) was a Scottish officer in the British Army who won the Military Cross for his actions in Tunis during World War II. After the war he became general manager of the Scottish Equitable Life Assurance Society.

References

External links 
150th anniversary launch

1917 births
2015 deaths
Military personnel from Dundee
People educated at the High School of Dundee
British actuaries
Derbyshire Yeomanry officers
British Army personnel of World War II
Recipients of the Military Cross
British businesspeople in insurance
Scottish financial businesspeople
Graduates of the Royal Military College, Sandhurst
20th-century Scottish businesspeople
Businesspeople from Dundee